Callionymus russelli, Russell’s dragonet, is a species of dragonet native to the Pacific waters off of Papua New Guinea.

Etymology
The specific name honours Clifford R. Johnson's father, Russell Johnson.

References 

Kailola, P.J., 1987. The fishes of Papua New Guinea: a revised and annotated checklist. Vol. II Scorpaenidae to Callionymidae. Research Bulletin No. 41, Research Section, Dept. of Fisheries and Marine Resources, Papua New Guinea.

R
Fish described in 1976